The Nye County Courthouse in Tonopah, Nevada is a two-story rusticated stone building. Its Romanesque Revival entrance and pointed dome are unique in Nevada. The courthouse was built following the move of the Nye County seat from Belmont to Tonopah in 1905.

History
The Nye County Courthouse in Belmont designed by John Keys Winchell was authorized in 1875.

The courthouse in Tonopah was designed by J.C. Robertson and completed in 1905.  A jail, also designed by Robertson, was added in 1907. It has been expanded with concrete block additions, while a glass vestibule obscures the entrance arch.

References

External links

 Nye County Courthouse, Online Nevada Encyclopedia

County courthouses in Nevada
Tonopah, Nevada
County Courthouse
Government buildings completed in 1905
Courthouses on the National Register of Historic Places in Nevada
National Register of Historic Places in Tonopah, Nevada
1905 establishments in Nevada
Italianate architecture in Nevada